Bibliometrix is a package for the R statistical programming language for quantitative research in scientometrics and bibliometrics.

Bibliometrics is the application of quantitative analysis and statistics to publications such as journal articles and their accompanying citation counts. Quantitative evaluation of publication and citation data is now used in almost all science fields to evaluate growth, maturity, leading authors, conceptual and intellectual maps, trend of a scientific community. Bibliometrics is also used in research performance evaluation, especially in university and government labs, and also by policymakers, research directors and administrators, information specialists and librarians, and scholars themselves.

The package is written in R, an open-source environment and ecosystem. The existence of substantial of good statistical algorithms, access to high-quality numerical routines, and integrated data visualization tools are perhaps the strongest qualities to prefer R to other languages for scientific computation.

Bibliometrix supports scholars in key phases of analysis:
 Data importing and conversion to R data-frame;
 Descriptive analysis of a publication dataset;
 Network extraction for co-citation, coupling, and collaboration analyses. Matrices are the input data for performing network analysis, factorial analysis or multidimensional scaling analysis;
 Text mining of manuscripts (title, abstract, authors'  keywords, etc.);
 Co-word analysis.

Main functions of Bibliometrix package 
The following table lists the main functions of bibliometrix package:

References

External links
Official website

R (programming language)
Quantitative research
Bibliometrics software